Anthony Morris may refer to:

 Anthony Morris (I) (1654–1721), also known as Anthony Morris Jr., early mayor of colonial Philadelphia
 Anthony Morris (II) (1682–1763), also known as Anthony Morris III, son of earlier mayor, and himself mayor of Philadelphia
 Anthony Morris (American football) (born 1992), Canadian football offensive guard

See also 
 Tony Morris (1962–2020), British newsreader for ITV Granada Reports